The Old Orchard Beach Raging Tide was a collegiate summer baseball team based in Old Orchard Beach, Maine. It was a member of the Futures Collegiate Baseball League (FCBL), a wood-bat league with a 56-game regular season comprising 10 teams from New Hampshire to western Connecticut. The team played its home games at The Ball Park.

Until 2012, the team was in the New England Collegiate Baseball League. For the first ten years of the team's existence, its home was in Lowell, Massachusetts and it was known as the All-Americans.

The 2014 season was the final year in Old Orchard Beach.  Owners John & Pam Gallo sold the Raging Tide franchise, which became the Bristol Blues.

History

All-Americans

In the 2000 season, the NECBL expanded by adding two teams: the Manchester Silkworms and the Mill City All-Americans. The name "All-Americans" came from the fact that Lowell was named an All-American City in 1999 and was named a finalist in 1997 and 1998. From 2000 to 2006, the team was known as the Mill City All-Americans because Lowell's nickname is "The Mill City." However, many NECBL teams are located in the "mill cities" of New England; and beginning with the 2007 season, the team changed its name to the Lowell All-Americans for clarity.

The All-Americans reached the playoffs in the team's inaugural season but fell 2 games to 1 to the then-Rhode Island Gulls. The team only reached the playoffs 2 more times: in 2002 and 2007.

Move to Old Orchard Beach
During the 2010 NECBL regular season, the All-Americans played two home games in Nashua, New Hampshire and one at The Ball Park in Old Orchard Beach. Newspapers in both places interpreted the decision as a search for a new home. The Ball Park, which once played host to the Triple-A Maine Guides and Maine Phillies, had fallen into disrepair but had been rehabilitated by local volunteers. The visitors for this contest, on July 2, were the Mainers of nearby Sanford, Maine.

On Sept. 22, 2010, the Old Orchard Beach Town Council accepted a letter of intent from the All-Americans to place a franchise at The Ball Park, a move that the NECBL had approved. The Town Council signed a final agreement on October 5. On November 8, the team announced that its name would be the Raging Tide.

The 2011 regular season featured six games against Sanford, three in each venue. The Raging Tide finished the inaugural season at The Ball Park with a record of 9-33, last in the Eastern Division.

Switch to FCBL
In 2012, the team jumped from the NECBL to the Futures Collegiate Baseball League, joined by fellow NECBL team, the North Shore Navigators, in a round of expansion that more than doubled the size of the FCBL.

Postseason appearances

NECBL

 *The NECBL did not separate into divisions until 2001.

FCBL

 *The FCBL changed its postseason to a two-round format starting in the 2012 season
 ** A one-game Play-In round was added in the 2013 season

References

External links
 Old Orchard Beach Raging Tide official site
 FCBL website
 NECBL website

Futures Collegiate Baseball League teams
New England Collegiate Baseball League teams
Defunct baseball teams in Maine
Amateur baseball teams in Maine
Sports in Old Orchard Beach, Maine
2000 establishments in Massachusetts
2014 disestablishments in Maine
Baseball teams established in 2000
Baseball teams disestablished in 2014